Broomedge is a village in Cheshire, England.

Villages in Cheshire